Below are the squads for the 2007 AFF Championship co-hosted by Thailand and Singapore which took place between 12 January and 4 February 2007. The players' listed age is their age on the tournament's opening day (12 January 2007).

Group A

Thailand
Head coach: Chanvit Phalajivin

Malaysia
Head coach: Norizan Bakar

Myanmar
Head coach: U Sann Win

Philippines
Head coach: Jose Ariston Caslib

Group B

Singapore
Head coach:  Raddy Avramovic

Vietnam
Head coach:  Alfred Riedl

Indonesia
Head coach:  Peter Withe

Laos
Head coach: Saythong Syphasay

References 
 Saaid, Hamdan. "ASEAN Football Federation Championship 2007 - Details". RSSSF

AFF Championship squads
Squads